Temple-Webster-Stoner House, also known as the Little House on Broad Run and Old Mill House, is a historic home located in West Bradford Township, Chester County, Pennsylvania. A datestone suggests the house was built in 1714, but may have been built at the time of the mill about 1730. It is a -story, fieldstone structure.  A kitchen wing was added about 1800.  Now used as a Unitarian Retreat.

It was added to the National Register of Historic Places in 1973.

References

External links

 Arnold-Temple House, Broad Run Road (West Bradford Township), Marshallton, Chester County, PA : 16 photos and 5 data pages, at Historic American Buildings Survey

Houses on the National Register of Historic Places in Pennsylvania
Houses completed in 1730
Houses in Chester County, Pennsylvania
National Register of Historic Places in Chester County, Pennsylvania